Kaptanganj Junction railway station is a small railway station in Kushinagar district, Uttar Pradesh. Its code is CPJ. It serves Kaptanganj town. The station consists of three platforms. The platforms are not well sheltered. It lacks many facilities including water and sanitation.

The Siwan–Kaptanganj line was opened between 1907 and 1913. The doubling work survey for Muzaffarpur–Gorakhpur main line was sanctioned in the Railway Budget of 2012–13.

The East Central Railway zone also applied for the electrification of the following sections to the Ministry of Railways (India) for the Rail Budget 2015–16. The doubling work survey for "Muzaffarpur–Gorakhpur main line" was sanctioned in the Railway Budget of 2012–13.

The East Central Railway zone also applied for the electrification of the following sections to the Ministry of Railways (India) for the Rail Budget 2015–16.

References 

Varanasi railway division
Railway stations in Kushinagar district